The Karanja (Karanya) were an indigenous Australian people of the state of Queensland.

Country
Their western boundaries were around Moorabulla (Mount David).

History of contact
When whites first began to settle the area in 1876, the Karanja were calculated to be around 250 people. Within a seven years, this figure dropped to 180, with settlers claiming that the reduction was caused by consumption and venereal disease.

Lifestyle 
The Karanja, other than what they could gather from hunting local game, relied on a bread cake made from nardoo seeds as a staple.

Alternative names
 Karenya
 Kurrana (from karana, meaning 'mkan')
 Mooraboola (toponym)
 Moorloobulloo
 Ngulubulu (language name)
 Ooloopooloo (garbled mishearing of their name)

Notes

Citations

Sources

Aboriginal peoples of Queensland